David Wotherspoon may refer to:

 David Wotherspoon (footballer, born 1849) (1849–1906), Scotland international who played for Queen's Park and Clydesdale
 David Wotherspoon (footballer, born 1990), for Hibernian and St Johnstone